James Deotis Roberts (July 12, 1927July 26, 2022) was an American theologian, and a pioneering figure in the black theology movement.

Biography 
Born in Spindale, North Carolina, Roberts earned a Bachelor of Arts degree from Johnson C. Smith University, a Bachelor of Divinity degree from Shaw University, and a Master of Sacred Theology degree from Hartford Seminary. In 1957, he became the first African American to earn a PhD from New College, University of Edinburgh, in philosophical theology. Later in 1994, he was awarded an honorary DLitt, also from the University of Edinburgh.

He taught at Howard University's School of Religion (1958–1980), served as president of the Interdenominational Theological Center from 1980 to 1983, and became Distinguished Professor of Philosophical Theology at Eastern Baptist Theological Seminary, serving there until 1998, after which he became a Distinguished Professor Emeritus. He was also the first and only black president of the American Theological Society (1994–1995).

Roberts became known for his work in black theology and the theology of Dietrich Bonhoeffer. A festschrift was prepared in his honor entitled The Quest for Liberation and Reconciliation (2005).

Black theology 
In the 1960s, Roberts and James H. Cone emerged as two leading figures in the black theology movement. Roberts challenged theologians such as Jürgen Moltmann as articulating theologies that were not relevant for black people in America. He also criticized the early works of Cone's, namely Black Theology and Black Power (1969), but also saw himself as mediating between Cone and Martin Luther King Jr.

Works

References

1927 births
2022 deaths
American theologians
20th-century African-American writers
20th-century American theologians
20th-century Protestant theologians
African-American theologians
American Christian theologians
People from Spindale, North Carolina
Writers from North Carolina